The Fagales are an order of flowering plants, including some of the best-known trees.  The order name is derived from genus Fagus, beeches.  They belong among the rosid group of dicotyledons. The anthophytes are a grouping of plant taxa bearing flower-like reproductive structures. They were formerly thought to be a clade comprising plants bearing flower-like structures.  The group contained the angiosperms - the extant flowering plants, such as roses and grasses - as well as the Gnetales and the extinct Bennettitales.

23,420 species of vascular plant have been recorded in South Africa, making it the sixth most species-rich country in the world and the most species-rich country on the African continent. Of these, 153 species are considered to be threatened. Nine biomes have been described in South Africa: Fynbos, Succulent Karoo, desert, Nama Karoo, grassland, savanna, Albany thickets, the Indian Ocean coastal belt, and forests.

The 2018 South African National Biodiversity Institute's National Biodiversity Assessment plant checklist lists 35,130 taxa in the phyla Anthocerotophyta (hornworts (6)), Anthophyta (flowering plants (33534)), Bryophyta (mosses (685)), Cycadophyta (cycads (42)), Lycopodiophyta (Lycophytes(45)), Marchantiophyta (liverworts (376)), Pinophyta (conifers (33)), and Pteridophyta (cryptogams (408)).

Five families are represented in the literature. Listed taxa include species, subspecies, varieties, and forms as recorded, some of which have subsequently been allocated to other taxa as synonyms, in which cases the accepted taxon is appended to the listing. Multiple entries under alternative names reflect taxonomic revision over time.

Betulaceae
Family: Betulaceae,

Alnus
Genus Alnus:
 Alnus glutinosa (L.) Gaertn., not indigenous, cultivated, naturalised, invasive

Betula
Genus Betula:
 Betula pendula Roth, not indigenous, cultivated, naturalised

Casuarinaceae
Family: Casuarinaceae,

Casuarina
Genus Casuarina:
 Casuarina cunninghamiana Miq. not indigenous, naturalised, invasive
 Casuarina equisetifolia L., not indigenous, naturalised, invasive
 Casuarina glauca Spreng. not indigenous, cultivated, naturalised

Fagaceae
Family: Fagaceae,

Castanea
Genus Castanea:
 Castanea sativa Mill. not indigenous, cultivated, naturalised, invasive

Quercus
Genus Quercus:
 Quercus palustris Munchh. not indigenous, cultivated, naturalised
 Quercus robur L. not indigenous, cultivated, naturalised, invasive
 Quercus rugosa Nee, not indigenous, cultivated, naturalised
 Quercus suber L. not indigenous, cultivated, naturalised, invasive

Juglandaceae
Family: Juglandaceae,

Pterocarya
Genus Pterocarya:
 Pterocarya stenoptera C.DC. not indigenous, cultivated, naturalised

Myricaceae
Family: Myricaceae,

Morella
Genus Morella:
 Morella brevifolia (E.Mey. ex C.DC.) Killick, endemic
 Morella cordifolia (L.) Killick, endemic
 Morella diversifolia (Adamson) Killick, endemic
 Morella humilis (Cham. & Schltdl.) Killick, endemic
 Morella integra (A.Chev.) Killick, endemic
 Morella kraussiana (Buchinger ex Meisn.) Killick, endemic
 Morella microbracteata (Weim.) Verdc. & Polhill, indigenous
 Morella pilulifera (Rendle) Killick, indigenous
 Morella quercifolia (L.) Killick, endemic
 Morella serrata (Lam.) Killick, indigenous

Myrica
Genus Myrica:
 Myrica brevifolia E.Mey. ex C.DC., accepted as Morella brevifolia (E.Mey. ex C.DC.) Killick, present
 Myrica cordifolia L., accepted as Morella cordifolia (L.) Killick, present
 Myrica diversifolia Adamson, accepted as Morella diversifolia (Adamson) Killick, present
 Myrica humilis Cham. & Schltdl., accepted as Morella humilis (Cham. & Schltdl.) Killick, present
 Myrica integra (A.Chev.) Killick, accepted as Morella integra (A.Chev.) Killick, present
 Myrica kraussiana Buchinger ex Meisn., accepted as Morella kraussiana (Buchinger ex Meisn.) Killick, present
 Myrica pilulifera Rendle, accepted as Morella pilulifera (Rendle) Killick, present
 Myrica quercifolia L., accepted as Morella quercifolia (L.) Killick, present
 Myrica serrata Lam., accepted as Morella serrata (Lam.) Killick, present

References

South African plant biodiversity lists
Fagales